Paul Haston is a writer based in Vancouver, British Columbia. He writes novels, short stories and screenplays across several genres including literary fiction, historical fiction and young adult. Novels include Rising of a Dead Moon, Blood and Doves and Echo and the Magical Whispers. Rising of a Dead Moon, published in 2013, is an historical fiction set against the backdrop of 19th Century Indian Indenture.

An advocate for protecting elephants, Haston's book Echo and the Magical Whispers was written to raise awareness of poaching of elephants for their ivory. The book was awarded a silver medal at the 2015 Moonbeam Children's Book Awards.

Early life

Haston was born in London, England and graduated in 1980 with a master's degree in English literature from Emmanuel College, Cambridge University.

Career
A career in finance has been augmented in recent years by writing. Haston published his debut novel Blood and Doves in October 2012, followed almost contemporaneously by Rising of a Dead Moon (first published October 2012, re-written and published in final form October 2013), and Echo and the Magical Whispers (September 2013). Haston has a spartan writing style that often requires the reader to provide linkages within the story line and characterisation Themes of class and the suffering of the under-privileged are pursued. Rising of a Dead Moon examines the plight of Indian widows in a historical context: the 19th century diaspora of 'coolies' from India to work on the white-owned sugar plantations in South Africa. Blood and Doves is a comment on Victorian class morality as seen through the eyes of a working class anti-hero.

Haston is an advocate for elephants and a member of several elephant charities. Echo and the Magical Whispers was written to raise awareness of poaching of elephants for their ivory. The book won a silver medal at the 2015 Moonbeam Children's Book Awards.

References

External links 
 Author Web Page
 Rising of a Dead Moon
  Blood and Doves
 Echo and the Magical Whispers
 Author Web Page
 Elephant Charity Page (Echo and the Magical Whispers)
 Surrey International Writers Conference
 Goodreads
 Rising of a Dead Moon Reviews

British writers
Living people
Writers from London
Writers from Vancouver
Year of birth missing (living people)